Goran Šušnjara (born 29 May 1958 in Split, SFR Yugoslavia) is a Croatian retired midfielder who played for Hajduk Split and is the current manager of Zmaj Makarska.

Playing career
Šušnjara started his career at RNK Split, making his debut against Dinara Knin. He joined Hajduk Split in 1982 after serving a year in the army. He later played for Šibenik and German side TSV Schwaben Augsburg.

Managerial career
Šušnjara was dismissed by NK Imotski in October 2015, then became assistant to head coach Zoran Vulić at RNK Split in May 2016. and later was reappointed manager of Orkan in March 2017, taking over from Dalibor Filipović after he had earlier taken charge replacing Ante Vitaić in autumn 2016. In September 2017, he was named manager at NK Val Kaštel Stari, succeeding Davor Čop.

He resigned as manager of Kamen Ivanbegovina in September 2022, then was appointed at the helm of Zmaj.

References

External links
 
forum.b92.net
Arhiva Hajdukovih utakmica
umn-split.hr

1958 births
Living people
Footballers from Split, Croatia
Association football midfielders
Yugoslav footballers
Croatian footballers
HNK Hajduk Split players
HNK Šibenik players
Yugoslav First League players
Landesliga players
Croatian Football League players
Yugoslav expatriate footballers
Expatriate footballers in West Germany
Yugoslav expatriate sportspeople in West Germany
Croatian football managers
NK Mosor managers
NK Imotski managers